Klaus Dede (1 June 1935 in Nordenham, Oldenburg – 5 May 2018, Oldenburg) was a German writer and journalist.

Life
Dede was born 1935 in Nordenham-Blexen. His father was a Lutheran priest. After school Dede studied during the 1950s. Later Dede worked as a newspaper reporter in Papenburg, Gütersloh and Nordenham. Dede wrote several books over local history in northern part of Lower-Saxony (Butjadingen, Oldenburg, Bremerhaven, Stedingen, Jade, Wesermarsch) and a book about Jesus Jesus – schwul?, Die Kirchen, die Christen und die Liebe (translated "Was Jesus gay?"). Dede lives in Oldenburg.

Works by Dede
 1975: Butjadingen – Portrait einer Landschaft. Fischerhude
 1975: Oldenburg und Ammerland
 1976: Bremerhaven und Wursten
 1976: Stedingen Ein Land, das nicht sein durfte. Fischerhude
 1978: An der Jade 1979: Hermann Tempel. Leer
 1980: Der kleine Oldenburger 1981: Fritz Mackensen. Der Entdecker Worpswedes 1981: Vom Moppenmann und anderen Leuten. Anekdoten aus dem Oldenburgischen 1982: Wesermarsch. Ein Heimatbuch 1986: Helene Brauer: Am Staugraben 1987: "... mein Oldenburg 1987: Antisemitismus in Oldenburg 1989: Die missbrauchte Hymne 1989: Helene Brauer-Dede: Frau Pastor 1990: Kategorie V: unbelastet. August Hinrichs und die Oldenburgische Landschaft 1990: Jesus war schwul. Die Kirche, die Christen und die Liebe 1992: Alkoholabstinenz als Ziel schulischer Prävention. Ein Disput zwischen Klaus Dede und Rüdiger Meyenberg 1993: Vom Rausch. Bibliographische Hinweise auf die Literatur der Abstinenz- und Temperenzbewegung in der Epoche des deutschen Nationalismus 1999: Butjadingen. Landschaft, Kultur, Informationen. Fischerhude
 2005: Gegen den Konsens. Oldenburg
 2006: Jesus - schwul?, Die Kirchen, die Christen und die Liebe 2009: Von böser Lust und rechter FreudigkeitReferences

External links
 
 www.klausdede.de Official website by Klaus Dede
 www.erinnerungsgang.de Official website of Erinnerungsgang''

1935 births
2018 deaths
People from Nordenham
German male journalists
German journalists
People from Oldenburg (state)
German male writers